HNK Rijeka Academy is the youth academy of HNK Rijeka. There are a total of eleven age categories within the academy, the oldest being the Juniori (under-19) and youngest the Morčići (under-8). Rijeka's football academy was officially founded in 1972. More than 400 youth footballers attend the academy.

Training camp
HNK Rijeka's youth academy are based at the newly built training camp, located in the Rujevica neighbourhood, 4 km northwest of the city centre. Officially opened in August 2015 at a cost of €24 million, the training centre was financed by the owners of HNK Rijeka. In addition to four fields that are mainly used by the club's youth teams, the facility also houses Stadion Rujevica, the first team's temporary home ground during construction of new Kantrida.

Rijeka U19
Rijeka U19 compete in the Croatian Academy Football League (Juniori).

Reserve team (2014–16)
HNK Rijeka II were HNK Rijeka's reserve team for two consecutive seasons. Rijeka II were formed in June 2014 and initially replaced the club's U19 team. For two seasons, Rijeka II competed in Croatia's 3. HNL. Following the end of the 2015–16 Croatian Third Football League, in May 2016, the club leadership decided to disband the reserve team.

Seasons

Key
P = Matches played; W = Matches won; D = Matches drawn; L = Matches lost; F = Goals for; A = Goals against; Pts = Points won; Pos = Final position.

Staff

 Director:  Fausto Budicin
 Assistant director:  Renato Pilipović
 Administrative director:  Ranko Buketa
 First-team liaison officer:  Vjekoslav Miletić
 Scout:  Željko Rukavina
 Goalkeeping coaches:  Marijan Jantoljak,  Đoni Tafra
 Doctors:  Luka Širola,  Andrej Zec
 Physiotherapists:  Bruno Greblički,  Alen Ilić,  Riva Milić
 Fitness coaches:  Ivana Marković,  Hrvoje Josipović
 Kit manager:  Josip Jeseničnik,  Denis Miškulin
 U19 manager:  Dragan Tadić
 U19 assistant manager:  Rade Ljepojević
 U17 manager:  Zdravko Šimić
 U17 assistant manager:  Nikola Radmanović
 U15 manager:  Dean Bolić
 U15 assistant manager:  Marin Duvnjak
 U14 manager:  Marin Juričić
 U13 manager:  Ivan Mijolović
 U12 manager:  Đulio Staver
 U11 manager:  Stipe Kardum
 U10 manager:  Kristijan Čaval
 U9 manager:  Valentino Klanac

Honours
 Croatian Championship U19 (5): 1981, 1987, 1992, 1996, 2014
 Croatian Championship U17 (1): 1990
 Yugoslav Cup U18 (1): 1982
 Croatian Cup U19 (6): 1982, 1990, 1992, 1993, 1997, 2007
 Croatian Cup U17 (2): 1989, 1994
 Kvarnerska Rivijera U19/U17 (Rijeka, Croatia) (20): 1957, 1960, 1964, 1968, 1973, 1975, 1987, 1989, 1992–93, 1996, 2001, 2006, 2009–12, 2014, 2016–17
 Bellinzona U18 (Bellinzona, Switzerland) (3): 1955, 1956, 1965
 Future Talents Cup U17 (Budapest, Hungary) (1): 2016
 Football Friends Foča U17 (Foča, Bosnia and Herzegovina) (3): 2016, 2017, 2018
 Karol Wojtyła Cup U19 (Province of Rome, Italy) (1): 2017

References

External links
Rijeka Academy
Prva HNL (U19)
Prva HNL (U17)
Prva HNL (U15)

Academy
Rijeka